The Ethical Tea Partnership (ETP) is a membership organisation working with tea companies, development organisations and governments to improve the lives of tea workers, farmers and their environment.

ETP's aim is to drive long-term, systemic change across three thematic areas in tea – economics, equality and environment. ETP's work improves the progress that is being made towards attaining the United Nations' Sustainable Development Goals in tea-growing regions. Read our Strategy2030 to learn more.

The organisation is made up of a small, but dedicated, expert teams across most tea growing regions, including Africa and Asia, as well as a London-based secretariat.

With the support of its 50 members, including the biggest multinational companies in the tea sector, ETP’s work to date has reached over one million people in tea communities. We are supported through a mix of international funding from the public and private sector, including its members, and are uniquely placed to bring the right partnerships together to achieve ETP's vision of a thriving, socially just and environmentally sustainable tea sector.

ETP's History
ETP was set up in 1997 by a pioneering group of tea experts who wanted to take a coordinated approach to addressing ethical issues in the tea supply chain. The approach was ground-breaking: at the time there was hardly any experience of social and environmental standards in the sector, and ETP's focus was on raising these.

ETP learnt a lot from this work, and know that audits can be a useful tool when trying to raise standards, but ETP is clear that they are not enough to address the fundamental issues that are holding back the sustainability of tea. Now that there is large-scale certification in the industry, ETP concentrates efforts wholly on achieving long-term change, and have phased out their auditing programme.

Today, ETP works with a membership of 50 international tea companies to tackle complex, deep-rooted issues that can’t be addressed sufficiently through certification alone. ETP convenes tea companies, development agencies, governmental, and non-governmental organisations to improve the lives of people in tea communities. ETP works in partnership to tackle the underlying issues that are holding back the sustainability of the sector.

ETP's work is far-reaching: working to improve the incomes and well-being of tea workers, small-scale farmers and their families, help to empower women to be more independent, reduce gender-based violence, and increase climate change resilience. As well as supporting communities on the ground with our programmes, ETP also leads the sustainability agenda through piloting business innovations and influencing policy.

ETP works with a range of public sector partners such as IDH – Sustainable Trade Initiative and German development agency GIZ, as well as NGOs such as UNICEF and Mercy Corps. ETP has a strong membership base with 50 international members, including tea companies and retailers from Asia, Australasia, Europe and North America.

Strategy2030

Development of Strategy2030 
In 2020, ETP systematically reviewed its activities through several avenues, including:

 a country-by-country analysis of the issues in tea, including the origin countries’ performance against the UN Sustainable Development Goals (SDGs);
 a high-level review of ETP’s current project portfolio examining the main focus areas of projects, the geographical distribution of project spend and the various roles that ETP plays in projects; and
 an extensive stakeholder consultation to understand how ETP is perceived and what stakeholders believe ETP should do.

The key findings from this research phase were:

 SDG #10 ‘Reduced inequalities’ is unachieved in all seven tea-producing countries under ETP’s purview;
 the prevalent issues in tea are low wages and incomes (below internationally accepted living wage and living income benchmarks), unsafe working conditions, gender inequality, inadequate housing, sanitation, nutrition, healthcare, education, and environmentally unsustainable practices;
 ETP’s projects have focused predominantly on improving lives by raising incomes and addressing the above issues. Secondary goals for ETP’s projects include empowering women and building resilience to climate change; and
 ETP most often plays the role of project implementor, although it also occasionally acts as a convenor, expert or pathfinder.

Proposed Strategy2030 
ETP recognises that it is uniquely positioned to convene the tea industry to catalyse transformational change for tea communities. The Strategy2030 combines the theory for systemic change and aligns ETP’s activities with commitments to improve economics, equality and environmental performance across the tea sector.

The strategy represents a shift in focus for ETP, with less emphasis on projects and a broader effort to orchestrate other activities to support systemic change – such as policy work, business innovation, shared learning and diverse partnerships. ETP intends to enhance the broader communication of its activities to enable awareness- raising, education and influencing. An important feature of ETP’s new approach will be the community-led project work, also known as a ‘participatory approach.’

Read more about ETP's Strategy 2030 here.

Membership
Membership of the Ethical Tea Partnership is open to any company involved with sourcing, trading or packing of tea sold in Europe, North America, Australia and New Zealand.

ETP Members 
The ETP's membership, in January 2023, consisted of 47 companies:
 A.C.Perchs Thehandel Aps
 Ahmad Tea
 alveus tea
 Bean Alliance Group
 Bell Tea Company
 Bigelow Tea
 Birchall Tea
 Booths
 Brew Tea Company
 China Mist Tea Company
 DAVIDsTEA
 DJ Miles & Co Ltd
 East West Tea Company
 Eteaket
 Fortnum & Mason
 Heritage Tees (Pat) Ltd
 Jacobs Douwe Egberts B.V.
 Jenier Limited
 Jing Tea Limited
 J.T. Ronnefeldt
 Keith Spicer (Tesco products only)
 Lavazza
 Lidl International
 Metropolitan Tea Co 
 Mother Parkers Tea & Coffee Inc
 Newby Teas
 Ostfriesische Tee Gesellschaft (OTG)
 Reginald Ames
 Ringtons
 Sirocco (A. Custer Sirocco AG)
 Starbucks Teavana
 Sipology by Steeped Tea
 Still & Lembke GmbG
 Tata Consumer Products
 Taylors of Harrogate
 Tea Drop Pty Ltd
 Tea Makers of London
 Tea Pigs
 Teasup
 Tesco PLC
 The Republic of Tea
 R. Twining & Co. Ltd.
 Typhoo
 Unilever PLC
 Whittard of Chelsea
 Wollenhaupt Tee GmbH: Tea Trading Division
 Yogi Tea

References

External links 
 Ethical Tea Partnership profile on database of market governance mechanisms

Tea production
Organizations established in 1997
British companies established in 1997
1997 establishments in the United Kingdom